Mallur is a village in the Ariyalur taluk of Ariyalur district, Tamil Nadu, India.

Demographics 

 census, Mallur had a total population of 1314 with 651 males and 663 females.

References 

Villages in Ariyalur district